is a former Japanese football player.

Playing career
Tazawa was born in Kanagawa Prefecture on April 29, 1978. Through Argentine club River Plate, he joined J1 League club Yokohama F. Marinos in 1999. However he could not play at all in the match. In 2000, he moved to J2 League club Vegalta Sendai. He played many matches as regular right side back in 2000. However he could not play at all in the match in 2001 and retired end of 2001 season.

Club statistics

References

External links

1978 births
Living people
Association football people from Kanagawa Prefecture
Japanese footballers
J1 League players
J2 League players
Yokohama F. Marinos players
Vegalta Sendai players
Association football defenders